Israel Hill developed as a community of free black people in Prince Edward County, Virginia along the Appomattox River around 1810. It was established by Judith Randolph after the death of her husband Richard Randolph who inherited land and slaves from his father. He was a nephew of Thomas Jefferson.

In 2009 a historical marker commemorating the community was erected. It is now part of Farmville, Virginia.

Melvin Patrick Ely, a history professor at the College of William and Mary, wrote Israel on the Appomattox about the community.

References

African-American history of Virginia
Populated places in Cumberland County, Virginia
1810 establishments in Virginia